The 2020 Copa CONMEBOL Libertadores Femenina was the 12th edition of the CONMEBOL Libertadores Femenina (also referred to as the Copa Libertadores Femenina), South America's premier women's club football tournament organized by CONMEBOL. The competition was played between 5 and 21 March 2021.

The tournament was originally to be held in Chile, scheduled for between 25 September and 11 October 2020. However, it was postponed by CONMEBOL on 19 June 2020 due to the COVID-19 pandemic, provisionally to early 2021. CONMEBOL announced on 20 November 2020 that the 2020 edition would be held in Argentina from 5 to 21 March 2021. Corinthians were the defending champions, but they were eliminated in the semi-finals.

Ferroviária (Brazil) defeated América (Colombia) 2–1 to win their second title.

Format
For the group stage, the 16 teams were drawn into four groups. Teams in each group played one another in a round-robin basis, with the top two teams of each group advancing to the quarter-finals. Starting from the quarter-finals, the teams played a single-elimination tournament.

Teams
The competition was contested by 16 teams:
the champions of all ten CONMEBOL associations
the title holders
an additional team from the host association
four additional teams from associations with the best historical performance in the tournament (associations in bold receive two berths according to the points total until the 2019 edition).
Brazil: 200 points
Chile: 127 points
Colombia: 105 points
Paraguay: 101 points
Argentina: 82 points
Venezuela: 76 points
Ecuador: 59 points
Uruguay: 42 points
Bolivia: 37 points
Peru: 28 points

Originally teams had to apply for a licence to compete in the tournament, but this requirement had been suspended due to the exceptional nature of the situation generated by the COVID-19 pandemic.

Notes

Venues

The matches were played in the José Amalfitani Stadium in Buenos Aires and the Estadio Nuevo Francisco Urbano in Morón.

Match officials
CONMEBOL released the list of match officials on 17 February 2021. Few days before the beginning of the tournament, the Uruguayan referee Claudia Umpiérrez was replaced by Anahí Fernández.

Draw
The draw for the tournament was held on 23 February 2021, 12:00 PYST (UTC−3), at the CONMEBOL Convention Centre in Luque, Paraguay. The 16 teams were drawn into four groups of four containing a team from each of the four pots. The defending champions Corinthians and the host country champions Boca Juniors were automatically seeded into Pot 1 and allocated to positions A1 and B1, respectively, in the group stage. The host country additional team River Plate were automatically seeded into Pot 3, while the four additional teams from associations with the best historical performance were automatically seeded into Pot 4. The remaining teams were seeded based on the results of their association in the 2019 Copa Libertadores Femenina. Teams from the same association could not be drawn into the same group.

Group stage
In the group stage, the teams were ranked according to points (3 points for a win, 1 point for a draw, 0 points for a loss). If tied on points, tiebreakers would be applied in the following order (Regulations Article 21).
Goal difference;
Goals scored;
Head-to-head result in games between tied teams;
Number of red cards;
Number of yellow cards;
Drawing of lots.

The winners and runners-up of each group advanced to the quarter-finals.

All times are local, ART (UTC−3).

Group A

Group B

Group C

Group D

Final stages
Starting from the quarter-finals, the teams played a single-elimination tournament. If tied after full time, extra time would not be played, and the penalty shoot-out would be used to determine the winners (Regulations Article 23).

Bracket

Quarter-finals

Semi-finals

Third place match

Final

Top goalscorers

References

External links
CONMEBOL Libertadores Femenina Argentina 2020, CONMEBOL.com

2020
2021 in women's association football
Association football events postponed due to the COVID-19 pandemic
2021 in South American football
2021 in Argentine football
International club association football competitions hosted by Argentina
March 2021 sports events in South America
2020
2020